"Dig Up Her Bones" is the seventh single by the punk rock band the Misfits. It was the first single released by the re-formed lineup of the band, after the original incarnation broke up in 1983. It was the only single released from their 1997 album American Psycho, and the accompanying music video was the first official Misfits music video ever released.

Background 
The original incarnation of the Misfits had been active from 1977 to 1983. A series of legal battles ensued in the late 1980s and early 1990s, with bassist Jerry Only and his brother, guitarist Doyle Wolfgang von Frankenstein, seeking writing credits and the rights to the Misfits name from singer/songwriter Glenn Danzig. The result was an out-of-court settlement in 1995 which gave Only and Doyle the rights to record and perform as the Misfits, sharing merchandising rights with Danzig. They quickly formed a new incarnation of the band, recruiting singer Michale Graves and drummer Dr. Chud. The new lineup released American Psycho in 1997 with "Dig Up Her Bones" as the seventh track.

Release information 
5,000 copies of the single were issued on blue 7" vinyl, while a promotional CD single was distributed to radio stations. The B-side of the single is "Hate the Living, Love the Dead", also from American Psycho.

Music video 
The music video for "Dig Up Her Bones" was directed by John Cafiero, who also directed a video for "American Psycho". It was the first official music video ever released by the Misfits and was composed of live footage of the band, Graves singing in a mock graveyard, and clips from the 1935 horror film Bride of Frankenstein. An image of the Bride was used as the cover image for the single. Permission to use the likeness of Boris Karloff, who played the Monster in the film, was given by his daughter Sarah Karloff. Permission was also given by the estate of Elsa Lanchester, who played The Bride, to use her likeness. Two cuts of the music video were released, the only difference being that one version incorporated an intro with the 1930s Universal Pictures logo and a dialogue clip from Bride of Frankenstein. Live portions of the video were shot at Lupo's Heartbreak Hotel in Providence, RI, on June 22, 1997.

The video debuted on MTV's 120 Minutes and was also featured on the Sci Fi Channel. Along with the "American Psycho" video, it continued to run in rotation on MTV, MTV Europe, MTV Japan, MTV Latin America, MTV Brasil, MuchMusic, and The Box.

Track listing

Personnel

Band 
 Michale Graves – lead vocals
 Jerry Only – bass, backing vocals
 Doyle Wolfgang von Frankenstein – guitars
 Dr. Chud – drums, backing vocals

Additional musicians 
 Daniel Rey – keyboards

See also 
Misfits discography

References 

1997 songs
Misfits (band) songs
Horror punk songs
Songs containing the I–V-vi-IV progression
Boris Karloff